A statue of Zhang Side is installed in Shanghai's People's Park, in China.

External links
 

Huangpu District, Shanghai
Monuments and memorials in China
Outdoor sculptures in Shanghai
Sculptures of men in China
Statues in China